Juan Ignacio Silva Cerón (born January 15, 1981 in Montevideo, Uruguay) is a Uruguayan footballer currently playing for Miramar Misiones of the Primera Division in Uruguay.

Teams
  River Plate 2000-2002
  Deportivo Maldonado 2003-2004
  Comunicaciones 2005
  Rentistas 2005-2006
  Rampla Juniors 2006
  Triestina 2007
  Peñarol 2007-2008
  Lyn Oslo 2008
  Rampla Juniors 2009
  Deportes La Serena 2009
  Rampla Juniors 2010
  Miramar Misiones 2011–present

References
 
 

1981 births
Living people
Uruguayan footballers
Uruguayan expatriate footballers
Club Atlético River Plate (Montevideo) players
Deportivo Maldonado players
Miramar Misiones players
Rampla Juniors players
C.A. Rentistas players
Peñarol players
Deportes La Serena footballers
Comunicaciones F.C. players
Serie B players
Expatriate footballers in Chile
Expatriate footballers in Italy
Expatriate footballers in Guatemala
Expatriate footballers in Norway
Association football midfielders